"Change of Heart" is a song by American singer and songwriter Cyndi Lauper, released on November 11, 1986 as the second single from her second album, True Colors (1986). It went gold in the US, peaking at No. 3 on the Billboard Hot 100. Popular remixes by Shep Pettibone were also released. A music video was produced for the song, filmed in Trafalgar Square in London. It features Lauper and her tour band (including David Rosenthal on keyboards) performing the song in front of a large group of people. The Bangles sang background vocals on the original recording. A live version of the song was released on Lauper's live album/DVD, To Memphis, with Love.

Critical response
Jimmy Guterman of Rolling Stone magazine said of the song in his album review for True Colors, "...Lauper's trademark hiccuped syllables rest on a cushion of harmonies supplied by The Bangles and transform what is little more than a sophisticated rhythm track with nominal lyrics into a heartfelt declaration of fidelity."

Cash Box called it "tough and tender" and praised the "punchy" guitars and rhythm track.  Billboard called it "solid rock" that's "neither wacky nor idiosyncratic."

Chart performance
"Change of Heart" debuted on the Billboard Hot 100 at No. 67 and reached a peak position of No. 3 on the issue dated 14 February 1987, spending a total of 17 weeks on the chart. It had similar success in the Hot Dance/Club Play Songs chart, hitting No. 4. The song placed at No. 61 on the year-end chart of 1987. In Canada, the song debuted at No. 88 on the RPM issue dated 13 December 1986. After 10 weeks, it reached a peak position of No. 13 and spent a total of 17 weeks in the chart. In the United Kingdom, "Change of Heart" debuted at No. 96 on the UK Singles Chart and was Lauper's least successful UK single to date, only reaching No. 67. Across Europe, "Change of Heart" peaked at No. 8 in France.

Music video

The official music video for the song was directed by Andy Morahan. It features Lauper and her tour band playing informal gigs in public locations in London, including Trafalgar Square, Leicester Square (with a clear shot of the poster for A Nightmare on Elm Street 2: Freddy's Revenge being visible at the Odeon), Covent Garden, and Westminster Bridge / The Queen's Walk, where the London Eye is currently located, 13 years before its opening.

Track listing

 US 12" single
"Change of Heart" (Extended Version) – 7:52
"Heartbeats" – 4:49
"Change of Heart" (Instrumental) – 5:52
"Witness" – 3:38

 US 7" single
"Change of Heart" – 3:58
"Witness" – 3:38

 UK 12" single
"Change of Heart" (Extended Version) – 7:52
"Heartbeats" – 4:49
"Change of Heart" (Instrumental) – 5:52
"What a Thrill" – 3:00

 UK 7" single
"Change of Heart" – 3:58
"What a Thrill" – 3:00

Credits and personnel
 Cyndi Lauper – co-production, vocals
 Essra Mohawk – songwriting
 Lennie Petze – co-production
 Shep Pettibone – mixing
 Nile Rodgers – guitar
 The Latin Rascals – editing
 Steve Peck – engineer
 The Bangles – backing vocals

Credits adapted from the album liner notes.

Charts

Weekly charts

Year-end charts

References

1986 songs
1986 singles
Cyndi Lauper songs
Epic Records singles
Music videos directed by Andy Morahan
Number-one singles in Israel
Song recordings produced by Cyndi Lauper
Songs written by Cyndi Lauper
Songs written by Essra Mohawk